The World Hates Jimmy is a bimonthly comic book series by D.C. Johnson, and published by WP Comics. It revolves around the misadventures of Jiminy Jones (Jimmy), as he bounces off of those around him to comedic effect. Jimmy is described as an exaggerated optimist, despite living a life of near constant peril. The series is known for being both cartoony and surreal, with many drawing comparisons to animated shows like SpongeBob SquarePants and The Ren & Stimpy Show in terms of style and tone.

References 

Comics titles